The 2009 Guadiana Trophy was a soccer competition that took place between 16-18 July 2009. This competition featured Benfica, Olhanense, Athletic Bilbao and Anderlecht.

Benfica won the 2009 Guadiana Trophy competition 2-1 in the final game against Olhanense.

The Guadiana Trophy competition was renamed to the Algarve Football Cup in 2014.

Matches

Semi-finals

Third place match

Final

2009–10
2009–10 in Portuguese football
2009–10 in Spanish football
2009–10 in Belgian football